Hossein Maadani (7 May 1971 – 1 August 2014) was an Iranian volleyball player and coach. He was assistant coach and head coach of Iran men's national volleyball team from 2007 to 2014.

Individual

Best Setter: 2002 Asian Club Championship

Notes

References
 نهم تیرماه، سالروز پرواز مرد بی‌همتای والیبال ایران و آذربایجان زنده یاد «حسین معدنی»

1971 births
People from Ardabil
Iranian men's volleyball players
2014 deaths
Volleyball players at the 1994 Asian Games
Iranian volleyball coaches
Medalists at the 2010 Asian Games
Asian Games competitors for Iran
21st-century Iranian people